Balang is a village in Salibabu district, Talaud Islands Regency in North Sulawesi province. Its population is 592.

Climate
Balang has a tropical rainforest climate (Af) with heavy to very heavy rainfall year-round.

References

Populated places in North Sulawesi